Oreste Edmundo Pereyra (22 October 1933 – 2 October 2019) was an Argentine novelist, short-story writer, essayist, poet and teacher.  He wrote many fictional books as well as educational manuals of great importance in his country.

Career 

Oreste Pereyra was born in La Banda, Santiago del Estero Province, Argentina, on October 22, 1933. He graduated as Normal Teacher at the José B. Gorostiaga Normal School and then as Philosophy and Pedagogy teacher, working in schools in his province until ascending as Vice-Rector of the School No. 677 José de San Martín. Likewise, he was part of the Disciplinary Court of the General Council of Education as a member and then president, he created the Teacher Improvement School, he was sub-Secretary of Municipal Education and Culture of La Banda, and he served as a professor of secondary and tertiary level, and ad-honorem at the "Mariano Moreno" School of Journalism.

Also dedicating his life to literature, his book "Manual Suplementario para Cuarto Grado de Santiago del Estero" was published by Estrada Editorial in 1967. Since then, he has also published numerous narrative books, obtaining prizes and distinctions in different literary contests.

Due to his career and contribution to culture, he was declared "Illustrious Citizen of the City of La Banda" and "Ciudadano Sanmartiniano". Finally, in 2018, he was distinguished as "Dr. Honoris Causa" by the National University of Santiago del Estero (UNSE).

On October 2, 2019, at the age of 85, he died in his hometown due to complications in his health, with several tributes dedicated in his memory.

Bibliography 
Oreste Pereyra's bibliography covers both educational materials, such as plays, stories, poems, stories and novels.
 Manual Suplementario para Cuarto Grado de Santiago del Estero
 Nochebuena
 Ha nacido el Niño
 La Ciudad Perdida
 El Diablo se marchó
 La breve historia de José Eusebio Bustos
 Santiaguito
 Santiaguito y sus amigos
 Manual de Santiago del Estero
 Al paso de los años: Centurias en la Madre de Ciudades

References 

1933 births
2019 deaths
20th-century Argentine poets
20th-century Argentine male writers
20th-century Argentine short story writers
Argentine essayists
Argentine male poets
Argentine male short story writers
Male essayists
20th-century essayists
Weird fiction writers
People from La Banda
Argentine schoolteachers
20th-century Argentine educators